The Open Notebook (TON) is a science journalism non-profit organization, online magazine, and publisher. Its purpose is to help science journalists improve their skills. It publishes articles and interviews on the craft of science writing and maintains a database of successful pitch letters to editors. TON also runs a paid fellowship program for early-career science journalists. The Open Notebook is supported by foundation grants and individual donations, and also partners with journalism and science communication organizations.

Description 
The Open Notebook was founded as a 501(c)(3) non-profit organization by freelance science journalists Siri Carpenter and Jeanne Erdmann.

Initially, its sole purpose was to publish "story-behind-the-story" interviews with journalists about the genesis and development of specific published pieces of science journalism. Subjects of interviews at The Open Notebook have included Rebecca Skloot, Kathryn Schulz, Ed Yong, Mary Heglar, Elizabeth Kolbert, Steve Silberman, Adriana Gallardo, Carl Zimmer, Ankita Rao, Nicola Twilley, David Quammen, Christie Aschwanden, Elizabeth Shogren, Natalie Wolchover, Seth Mnookin, Cynthia Graber, and Gabriel Mac.

In 2011, Carpenter and Erdmann expanded the project to include a pitch database, an advice column, and articles on topics such as structuring narrative feature articles, finding and sharpening story ideas, taking good notes as a reporter, and pitching story ideas to editors.

Knight Science Journalism at MIT wrote of the organization:

Gary Price of Library Journal said The Open Notebook "provides unique tools and resources to help science journalists at all experience levels hone their craft". Spencer Davis of The Freelancer by Contently said TON's site "was built for science journalists in particular, but many of the site's resources are just as applicable to all freelance writers".

Tara Haelle of the Association of Health Care Journalists wrote, "Perhaps the best science journalism site/blog out there is The Open Notebook, chock full of advice, tips, guides and inspiration." She listed the organization of topics on the site: "Breaking In; Finding Ideas; Pitching; Story Planning and Reporting; Writing Accurately, Clearly and Engagingly; Fact-Checking, Self-Editing and Revising; The Business and Economics of Freelancing; Being Part of the Science Journalism World; and Looking for Inspiration?"

David Dobbs, writing in Wired, called TON "The wonderful shop-talk site for science writers."

Articles on science writing craft 
The Open Notebook publishes articles focused on elements of science writing and editing craft. Topics include reporting on risk, reading scientific papers, covering preprint manuscripts, writing about disability, making freedom-of-information requests, being a science writer and managing a mental illness, finding and pitching stories to editors, negotiating freelance rates, and interviewing sources about trauma.

The Open Notebook partnered in 2016 with the Council for the Advancement of Science Writing (CASW) to co-publish Storygrams, a series of annotated articles analyzing exceptional qualities of notable science stories. Each piece in the series includes an in-depth embedded analysis of the story and an accompanying interview with its author. Undark summarized the project, "The Storygrams project from The Open Notebook aims to highlight what makes the best science writing stand out." Articles examined through this series include works originally published in The New Yorker, The New York Times, National Geographic, Nature, The Atlantic, The New Republic, and other media outlets.

Writer profiles 
In the "A Day in the Life" series, The Open Notebook publishes brief profiles of working science journalists. In the series, writers and editors describe where they work, their favorite productivity and note-taking tools, their reading habits, and other aspects of their daily working routines. Spencer Davis wrote that the series "resembles the New York Times s 'By the Book' column—which interviews famous personalities on their reading and writing habits—but with a focus on journalists". Writers profiled through this series have included science journalists such as Maryn McKenna, Virginia Hughes, Nadia Drake, Amy Maxmen, Helen Ouyang, Anahad O'Connor, and Rhitu Chatterjee.

 Collections 
The Open Notebook publishes several topical collections of articles on science journalism. Among others these include a collection of resources on diversity, equity, and inclusion in science writing. The collection includes a resource page to assist journalists in finding diverse science sources and a collection of diversity style guides for journalists. It also offers the article series "Diverse Voices in Science Journalism," which is published in collaboration with the National Association of Science Writers (NASW) Diversity Committee. The series has included articles on subjects such as covering indigenous communities, dealing with harassment from sources, including LGBTQ+ scientists as sources, navigating newsrooms as a minority, decolonizing science writing in South Africa, and working with a sensitivity reader.

 Pitch database 
The Open Notebook'''s pitch database includes more than 200 successful pitch letters for news and feature stories to help writers gain better understanding of what makes a pitch most likely to succeed. Spencer Davis wrote, "Sections like the Pitch Database, which publishes successful pitches submitted by real journalists, can be extremely useful for figuring out what works and what doesn't." When The Open Notebook published its first book, The Craft of Science Writing, in 2020, some pitches from the pitch database were included in annotated form. In that piece, journalist Roxanne Khamsi pointed out well-executed elements of certain pitch letters, discussing what makes those elements important and that likely contributed to their success.

 Early-career fellowships 
The organization started a fellowship program in 2013 for early-career science journalists. Through this program, fellows report and write articles on the craft of science writing for publication at The Open Notebook. Some alumni of the program include Tina Casagrand, Tiên Nguyễn, Aneri Pattani, Julia Rosen, Christina Selby, Jane C. Hu, Rodrigo Pérez Ortega, Rachel Zamzow, Geoffrey Giller, Knvul Sheikh, Jennifer Lu, Shira Feder, and Katherine J. Wu.

 Spanish translations 
In 2019, The Open Notebook began translating some of its reported features into Spanish. The TON en Español Spanish translation series includes articles such as reporting on preprint manuscripts, spotting shady statistics in scientific papers, solutions journalism for science reporters, and the shortage of Spanish-language science journalism in the U.S.

 Science Storytellers 
In 2017, The Open Notebook became a partner with, and fiscal sponsor of, Science Storytellers, an organization that helps children interview scientists using tools of science journalism. This organization, founded by science writer Jennifer Cutraro, operates booths at science fairs and festivals, including at the American Association for the Advancement of Science's annual Family Science Days and at the American Chemical Society's ACS Kids Zone event.

 Peeps science diorama contest 
In 2019, The Open Notebook hosted the first annual science-themed Peeps diorama contest. The project was the idea of Helen Fields, Kate Ramsayer and Joanna Fields, who had participated in past Peeps diorama contests hosted by The Washington Post and other publications. From 50 entries, winners included dioramas depicting, in Peeps, NASA's Hidden Figures, a virology laboratory, the National Museum of Natural History, and other scientific themes.

 Contributors 
Contributors to The Open Notebook have included writers such as Nadia Drake, Ed Yong, Carl Zimmer, Laura Helmuth, Kendra Pierre-Louis, Sharon Begley, Tasneem Raja, Michelle Nijhuis, Anil Ananthaswamy , Melinda Wenner Moyer, Shraddha Chakradhar, Tom Yulsman, Olga Kreimer, Roxanne Khamsi, Brooke Borel, Mara Hvistendahl, George Musser, Azeen Ghorayshi, Sandeep Ravindran, and Charles Seife.

 Funding The Open Notebook is supported by individual contributions and by grants from charitable foundations. TONs early-career fellowship program is supported by the Burroughs Wellcome Fund. The Gordon and Betty Moore Foundation has supported TON's story-annotation from series a grant to CASW as well as other TON programs. TON's Diverse Voices series is supported by Science Sandbox, an initiative of the Simons Foundation. In 2020 The Open Notebook announced that the Kavli Foundation would support development of a series of email mini-courses. Funding from the Therese Foundation helps support development of topical collection, and The Open Notebook has also received funding from the National Association of Science Writers and the Knight Science Journalism program at MIT, which said on its site, "It's a fantastic resource for science journalists, whether they're veterans or greenhorns".

 Selected publications 
 

 See also 

 Association of Health Care Journalists
 Council for the Advancement of Science Writing
 Environmental journalism
 Medical journalism
 Nature writing
 Non-profit journalism
 Popular science writing
 Public awareness of science
 Society of Environmental Journalists
 Society of Professional Journalists

 References 

 External links ''

2010 establishments in Wisconsin
Non-profit organizations based in Wisconsin
Organizations established in 2010
Science writing organizations
Works about journalism